Rum Rebellion is the debut album by the Australian folk punk band Mutiny. It was released in 1997 by Deported Records in Australia. It was reissued in the U.S. on Hell's Ditch Records in 1999 and again in 2002 on Fistolo Records.  Portland, Oregon-based Irish punk band Rum Rebellion cites both this album and the Australian rebellion of the same name as inspiration for their band name.

Track listing
 "Bligh" – 3:42
 "Girlz on the Fiddle" – 2:56
 "High on the Hill" – 4:08
 "Here's to Adventure" – 0:54
 "Take a Chance" – 3:09
 "Knife" – 4:30
 "These Streets" – 3:38
 "Bodgy Tatts" – 2:32
 "Drink to Better Days" – 5:23
 "Enjoy It While It Lasts" – 2:55
 "Diddly Squat" – 1:52

Credits
 Alice – bass
 Chris – vocals, drums
 Greg – acoustic and electric guitar, mandolin, vocals
 Michelle – 5 string violin, vocals
 Briony – vocals, acoustic 12 string guitar, mandolin, tin whistle

With guests
 Dan Green – piano accordion
 Gus McMillan – banjo
 Dave Corbet – trumpet

Mutiny (band) albums
1997 albums